Doto Mashaka Biteko (born December 30, 1978) is a Tanzanian politician and a member of the Chama Cha Mapinduzi political party. He was elected MP representing Bukombe in 2015.

He was appointed as the Minister of Minerals on 9 January 2019.

References 

1978 births
Living people
Chama Cha Mapinduzi politicians
Tanzanian MPs 2015–2020
Tanzanian Roman Catholics